Mirobriga may refer to:

 The ancient Celtic name of the modern town of Ciudad Rodrigo, Spain
 Miróbriga, the site of Roman ruins near Santiago do Cacém, Portugal